Serbia selected their Junior Eurovision entry for 2007 through a national final consisting of 10 songs. The winning song was selected by televoting and jury voting, which was Nevena Božović with "Piši mi".

Before Junior Eurovision

National final 
Ten songs competed during the final at the Milenium on 7 October 2007, hosted by Miki Damjanović, Ksenija, Blanka and Duška Vučinić-Lučić. The winner was decided by a combination of votes from a jury panel, consisting of Bebi Dol, Slobodan Marković, Dragana Jovanović, Vladimir Graić and Vladana Marković, and the Serbian public. "Piši mi" performed by Nevena Božović was selected as the winner.

At Junior Eurovision

Voting

Notes

References 

2007
Serbia
Junior Eurovision Song Contest